Randolph is an unincorporated community in Brown County, in the U.S. state of South Dakota.

History
Randolph was laid out in 1906, and named for John Randolph, who was scalped by Indians near that point. A post office called Randolph was established in 1908, and remained in operation until 1953.

References

Unincorporated communities in Brown County, South Dakota
Unincorporated communities in South Dakota